Râmnicu Vâlcea (also spelled Rîmnicu Vîlcea or, in the past, Rîmnic-Vâlcea) (population: 93,151 as per the 2021 Romanian census held in 2022) is the county seat town and also the largest urban settlement of Vâlcea County, central-southern Romania (in the historical province of Oltenia).

Geography and climate 

Râmnicu Vâlcea is situated in the central-south area of Romania and is the county capital of Vâlcea County. The southern limit of the city is formed by the Getic Plateau and the Olt River valley.

The E81 road (a road of European interest) and one of the main national railway routes cross the town.

According to Köppen climate classification, the climate of the town is defined as Dfa (humid continental with warm summers) bordering Cfa (humid subtropical). Precipitation amount is higher in the summer, although not high enough in order to be a "Dwa" type climate.

The table below highlights climate data for Râmnicu Vâlcea between 1981 and 2010, detailing the average high temperature, the average low temperature, the average precipitation (in mm/inches) as well as the average precipitation days throughout all of the months of one year.

History 

The area has been inhabited since Dacian and Roman times, and was the site of a castrum (known as Buridava or Burridava, previously a Dacian town). A new fortress was built on the location during the Middle Ages. Râmnicu Vâlcea was first attested during the rule of Prince Mircea cel Bătrân, as "the princely town of Râmnic" (4 September 1388), and confirmed as the seat of a Vâlcea County during the same period (8 January 1392).

The town seal dates to 1505. Cetățuia, the actual fortress, served as the residence of Oltenian Bans and, from 1504, of the Orthodox bishops of the Râmnic Diocese; in 1529, Prince Radu of Afumați was killed in Cetățuia by a boyar conspiracy.

During the rules of Matei Basarab and Constantin Brâncoveanu, it became an important cultural center. It was here where the first paper mill and printing press in Romania were built (see Anthim the Iberian). The town was heavily damaged during the Habsburg monarchy's takeover of Oltenia which lasted between 1718 and 1739, and its purpose was again reduced to that of a fortress.

During the Wallachian Revolution, on 29 July 1848, Deșteaptă-te, române! (the current national anthem of Romania), with lyrics written by Andrei Mureșanu and music composed by Anton Pann (whose memorial house lies in the center of the town), was sung for the first time in Râmnicu Vâlcea. 

Gheorghe Magheru gathered his military force in Râureni, now part of the town, in an attempt to face the anti-revolutionary forces of Imperial Russia and the Ottoman Empire.

In the 1980s, the town was completely rebuilt in a style combining socialist realism with local vernacular architecture (of Brâncovenesc style). 

The town was the center and peak point of the path of total darkness of the Solar eclipse of 11 August 1999. Around 2005, the town gained notoriety as a centre of cybercrime.

Politics 

The mayor of Râmnicu Vâlcea is Mircia Gutău of the Romanian Ecologist Party (PER), following the 2020 Romanian local elections. The Râmnicu Vâlcea Municipal Council, elected at the 2020 local elections, consists of 23 councillors, with the following party composition:

Sports 
Râmnicu Vâlcea is home to SCM Râmnicu Vâlcea, which is a women's handball club that competes traditionally in the EHF Champions League. At football, the town was previously known for its now dissolved local football club Chimia Râmnicu Vâlcea which won one Romanian cup in 1973. It briefly participated in the UEFA Cup Winners' Cup/European Cup Winners' Cup during one season (namely in 1973–1974) for just one round (more specifically the first one) against Northern Irish side Glentoran F.C. which subsequently went on to the quarter-finals.

Villages 

The city administers thirteen villages: Aranghel, Căzănești, Copăcelu, Dealu Malului, Fețeni, Goranu, Lespezi, Poenari, Priba, Râureni, Săliștea, Stolniceni, and Troian. Goranu, Fețeni, Lespezi, and Săliștea were a separate commune, Goranu, until 1996, when they were merged into the town.

Notable people 
 Radu Berceanu (born 1953), engineer and politician
 Dan Burghelea (born 1943), mathematician
 Florin Cîțu (born 1972), politician who served as Prime Minister
 Bogdan-Daniel Deac (born 2001), chess grandmaster
 Doru Dudiță (born 1977), footballer 
 Ion Emanuel Florescu (1819–1893), general who served as Chief of the General Staff and Prime Minister
 Gheorghe I. Lahovary (1838–1909), engineer and writer
 Gabriel Liiceanu (born 1942), philosopher
 Nicolae Manolescu (born 1939), literary critic
 Marian-Jean Marinescu (born 1952), politician
 Maria Marinela Mazilu (born 1991), skeleton racer 
 Horia Moculescu (born 1937), pianist and composer
 Mihail Oromolu (1875–1945), magistrate and politician
 Alexandru Papadopol (born 1975), actor
 Dem Rădulescu (1931–2000), theatre, film, and television actor, and academic
 Dorel Zugrăvescu (1930–2019), geophysicist

Gallery

See also  

 Oltchim S.A.
 Chimia Râmnicu Vâlcea

References

External links 

 Râmnicu Vâlcea City Hall official site 

 
Cities in Romania
Populated places in Vâlcea County
Capitals of Romanian counties
Localities in Oltenia